.lv is the Internet country code top-level domain (ccTLD) for Latvia. It was introduced on 29 April 1993, two years after the country's independence.

Registration is permitted at the second level, and this is the form of registration currently encouraged by the registry; however, registrations are also accepted at the third level beneath a number of subdomains:

 .com.lv - commercial entities
 .edu.lv - educational institutions
 .gov.lv - government and semi-government entities.
 .org.lv - various forms of affiliation groups
 .mil.lv - defense/military entities of Latvia
 .id.lv - individuals
 .net.lv - network infrastructure providers
 .asn.lv - associations
 .conf.lv - conferences and exhibitions requiring short duration Internet connectivity

Registration is open to foreigners, though the dispute policy says that precedence is generally given to domestic users.  There does not appear to be much non-Latvian use of this TLD; exceptions include a few sites apparently using it to suggest Las Vegas—much as .la is used for Los Angeles—or “love”—as in “my.lv,” “we.lv,” or “true.lv”—and “live”—as in  “xbx.lv” used by Microsoft for shortening links to their Xbox Live service—but these types of uses are not widespread.

The gambling site Bovada, formerly known as Bodog, moved to an .lv domain after the United States Department of Homeland Security confiscated its former domain, bodog.com, in 2012.

Internationalized domain names may also be registered.

References

External links
 IANA .lv whois information

Country code top-level domains
Telecommunications in Latvia
Computer-related introductions in 1993
Council of European National Top Level Domain Registries members